Liskinskoye is a rural locality (a selo) and the administrative center of Krasnoznamenskoye Rural Settlement, Liskinsky District, Voronezh Oblast, Russia. The population was 1,505 as of 2010. There are 19 streets.

Geography 
Liskinskoye is located 9 km northeast of Liski (the district's administrative centre) by road. Liskinskoye 2-ye otdeleniye is the nearest rural locality.

References 

Rural localities in Liskinsky District